This is a List of mountain ranges of the Lower Colorado River Valley, located in the western part of the southwestern United States; the eastern region would be the Rio Grande Valley of New Mexico, Texas, and northern Mexico.

This doubled list has the North–South running Colorado River sectioned into the west side of the river vs. the east side. The east side of the Colorado River is represented by the states of Arizona-Sonora, Mexico.  The west side of the river is represented by southern Nevada, southeast Low Desert California, and a portion of northwestern Mexico, represented by the state of Baja California-(the North).

West-bank, East-bank mountain ranges
The numbered Mountain ranges abut the Colorado River proper or are associated with valleys or plains, and are somewhat arbitrary. (Though the river flows north to south, a few ranges are East–West, or Northwest–Southeast, per the original Basin and Range faulting.)

West Bank–Colorado Riv.
..
Mojave Desert
(Boulder City, Nevada)
1–Eldorado Mountains–Nevada
El Dorado Canyon, (Nelson, Nev.)
2–Newberry Mountains (Nevada)
Pyramid Canyon
3–Dead Mountains
4–Sacramento Mountains (California)
5–Piute Range–Calif/Nevada
Lanfair Valley, Piute Range–Calif/Nevada
New York Mountains-(Mojave National Preserve)–Calif/Nevada
..
Turtle Mountains4–Sacramento Mountains (California)
Chemehuevi Valley
6–Chemehuevi Mountains
Chemehuevi Valley
Turtle Mountains,7–-Whipple Mountains
Mojave Desert
Colorado Desert
Turtle Mountains,8.5–Nopah Range-Vidal Valley
..
9–Riverside Mountains
Sand dunes,--Rice Valley
Big Maria Mountains
Little Maria Mountains, 10–Big Maria Mountains
11–McCoy Mountains
Palo Verde Valley
12–Mule Mountains (California)
..
..
13–Chuckwalla Mountains
14–Chocolate Mountains
...
..
15–Imperial Dam Long Term Visitor Area=Senator Wash Hills
Algodones Dunes
16–Cargo Muchacho Mountains
17–Pilot Knob (Imperial County, California)
Colorado Desert–W. Sonoran Des.
..
West Bank–Colorado Riv.

East Bank–Colorado Riv.
Mojave Desert
Lake Mead
Black Mtns: Mount Wilson (5445 ft)
Detrital Plain, White Hills
1–Black Mountains, Cerbat Mountains
Black Canyon of the Colorado
Sacramento Valley
2–Black Mesa (western Arizona), Hualapai Mountains-(Hualapai Mountain)
Mohave Valley, 2.5–Black Mesa (western Arizona)
3–Mohave Mountains
Dutch Flat
Dutch Flat, McCracken Mountains, Poachie Range
Aubrey Hills
Bill Williams Mountains
Rawhide Mountains
Bill Williams River
and the Big Sandy River (Arizona)-(Kingman, Arizona)
4–Buckskin Mountains (Arizona)
Buckskin Mountain State Park
Cactus Plain
Sonoran Desert
La Posa Plain, Plomosa Mountains
5–Dome Rock Mountains, Harcuvar Mountains
Kofa Mountains
Castle Dome Mountains
6–Trigo Mountains, Chocolate Mountains (Arizona)
Castle Dome Plain
United States Army Yuma Proving Ground
Laguna Mountains (Arizona)7–Muggins Mountains
Gila River
Laguna Mountains (Arizona)
Yuma Desert
8–Gila Mountains, Tinajas Altas Mountains, Lechuguilla Desert
Sonoran Desert
Reserva de la Biosfera el Pinacate y Gran Desierto de Altar
East Bank–Colorado Riv.

The western route parallelling the Colorado River, covers more plains, of the Colorado Desert/Mojave Desert, rising to, and down from various mountain passes, (for example south of Needles, California (the Sacramento Mountains (California)), or Searchlight, Nevada). Only washes drain from the west into the Colorado River.

Alphabetical lists: West, East 

NEVADA
Eldorado Mountains
New York Mountains
Newberry Mountains (Nevada)
Piute Range
CALIFORNIA
Big Maria Mountains
Little Maria Mountains
Cargo Muchacho Mountains
Chemehuevi Mountains
Chocolate Mountains
Chuckwalla Mountains
Dead Mountains
Little Maria Mountains
Big Maria Mountains
McCoy Mountains
Mule Mountains (California)
New York Mountains
Nopah Range
Pilot Knob (Imperial County, California)
Riverside Mountains
Sacramento Mountains (California)
Turtle Mountains (California)
Whipple Mountains

ARIZONA
Black Mesa (western Arizona)–(south portion of Black Mountains)
Black Mountains (Arizona)
Buckskin Mountains (Arizona)
Castle Dome Mountains
Cerbat Mountains
Chocolate Mountains (Arizona)
Dome Rock Mountains
Harcuvar Mountains
Hualapai Mountains-(Hualapai Mountain)
Kofa Mountains
Laguna Mountains (Arizona)
McCracken Mountains
Mohave Mountains
Muggins Mountains
Plomosa Mountains
Poachie Range
Rawhide Mountains
Tinajas Altas Mountains
Trigo Mountains
White Hills (Arizona)

See also
Mountain ranges of the Lower Colorado River Valley index
Mountain ranges of the Mojave Desert
Mountain ranges of the Colorado Desert
List of mountain ranges of the Sonoran Desert
List of regions of the United States
List of mountain ranges of Arizona
List of mountain ranges of California
List of mountain ranges of Nevada
List of Arizona state parks
List of Wildlife Refuges of the LCRV

 
 
Mountain ranges of the Mojave Desert
Mountain ranges of the Colorado Desert
Mountain ranges of the Sonoran Desert
Colorado, Lower, River Valley, List of mountain ranges of
Colorado